Gentleman Usher and Lady Usher are titles for some officers of the Royal Household of the United Kingdom. For a list of office-holders from the Restoration of the monarchy in 1660 up to the present day see List of Ushers.

Gentleman Ushers as servants

History

Gentleman Ushers were originally a class of servants found not only in the Royal Household, but in lesser establishments as well. They were regularly found in the households of Tudor noblemen, and were prescribed by Richard Brathwait, in his Household of an Earle, as one of the "officers and Servants the state of an Earle requireth to have". The Gentleman Ushers occupied an intermediate level between the steward, the usual head, and the ordinary servants; they were responsible for overseeing the work of the servants "above stairs", particularly those who cooked and waited upon the nobleman at meals, and saw to it the great chamber was kept clean by the lesser servants. He was also responsible for overseeing other miscellaneous service, such as the care of the nobleman's chapel and bed-chambers. It was traditionally the Gentleman Usher who swore in new members of the nobleman's service.

The duties of a Gentleman Usher, not unlike those of a contemporary butler, made him quite important in Tudor and 17th-century households. George Chapman's play The Gentleman Usher has as its title character the pompous but easily fooled Bassiolo, Gentleman Usher to Lord Lasso.

Royal Gentleman Ushers

The Gentleman Ushers of the Royal Household, in order of precedence, were originally the four Gentleman Ushers of the Privy Chamber (who attended the Sovereign in the Privy Chamber), the four Gentleman Ushers Daily Waiters, and the eight Gentleman Ushers Quarter(ly) Waiters. The latter two originally served different terms of service, but the distinction later became only nominal, as the role of the Gentleman Ushers became increasingly ceremonial and they exercised less supervision over the staff. In 1901, King Edward VII abolished the three classes and began to appoint simply Gentleman Ushers in Ordinary. The first Lady Usher of the Black Rod was appointed in 2017.  The first Lady Usher in Ordinary was appointed in 2021.

Present day
Today an establishment of 10 Lady and Gentleman Ushers is maintained for attendance at royal events. Lady and Gentleman Ushers to The King are generally appointed from retired military officers with three representing the Royal Navy, four representing the Army and three representing the Royal Air Force.

When on duty Ushers generally wear either service uniform with a brassard displaying the royal cypher or morning or evening dress, depending on the occasion. They receive a modest honorarium for the upkeep of their orders of dress.

Among their duties, they act as ushers at Royal Garden Parties and Investitures as well as on State occasions. At royal weddings, funerals, coronations and other large church services they may be called upon to lead royal and other important guests in procession before conducting them to their seats. Occasionally they may be called upon to attend an event (e.g. a memorial service) as the monarch's representative. 

Ushers retire at 70, when they may become Extra Gentleman Ushers.

Particular Gentleman Ushers

Certain Gentleman Ushers have duties outside of the Royal Household, usually attached either as officers of an order of knighthood or to a House of Parliament. These are, in order of antiquity:

The Gentleman Usher of the Black Rod, established c.1361 as an officer of the Order of the Garter, who also serves as secretary to the Lord Great Chamberlain and Doorkeeper of the House of Lords and (since 1971) Serjeant-at-Arms of the House of Lords. During the Tudor period, he was usually one of the senior members of the Royal Household, such as the Groom of the Stool; from the Restoration until 1765, Black Rod was the senior of the existing Gentleman Usher Daily Waiter, after which a new Daily Waiter was appointed to succeed the previous Black Rod. The first Lady Usher of the Black Rod, Sarah Clarke, was appointed as the new Black Rod on 17 November 2017. She formally took on the duties as Lady Usher of the Black Rod in February 2018.
The Gentleman Usher of the White Rod, established as a hereditary dignity c.1373, who attended the Parliament of Scotland before its abolition in 1707. The heritable office was pronounced to be adjudgeable in 1758, and has been bought and sold several times since then. The position was revived to some degree in connection with the Parliament of Great Britain, and is now held by the Walker Trustees.
 The Gentleman Usher of the Green Rod, established 1714, is the usher for the Scottish Order of the Thistle, currently Rear Admiral Christopher Hope Layman.
 The Irish Gentleman Usher of the Black Rod, established 1783, is the usher for the Irish Order of St Patrick; there have been no appointees to the office since 1933.
 The Gentleman Usher of the Scarlet Rod, established in 1725, is the usher for the British Order of the Bath. The present Scarlet Rod is Major General James Gordon.
 The Gentleman Usher to the Sword of State, established c.1842, is the usher who bears the Sword of State in ceremonial processions, currently General Sir Kevin O'Donoghue.
 The Gentleman Usher of the Blue Rod, established as 1882 as an "Officer of Arms" and made an usher in 1911, is the usher for the British Order of St Michael and St George, currently Dame DeAnne Julius.
 The Gentleman Usher of the Purple Rod, established in 1918, is the usher for the Order of the British Empire, currently Dame Amelia Fawcett.

Gentleman Ushers of the Black Rod also exist for New Zealand, Australia and its states, and Canada. In some respects, the Military Social Aides to the US President, who attend on some 2 to 4 afternoons a month to assist visitors to the White House, are an American and more recent equivalent to the Gentleman Ushers in Ordinary.

References

Ceremonial officers in the United Kingdom
Positions within the British Royal Household
Ushers